Albert Roméo "Ab" Renaud, sometimes referred to as Albert Ranaud, (October 2, 1920 – December 19, 2012) was a Canadian ice hockey player. He was a member of the Ottawa RCAF Flyers who won the gold medal in ice hockey for Canada at the 1948 Winter Olympics in St. Moritz.

In 2001 Renaud was honoured by the Canadian Forces when it was announced that the 1948 RCAF Flyers were selected as Canada's greatest military athletes of the 20th century.

References

External links
bio
Albert Renaud's obituary

1920 births
2012 deaths
Ice hockey players at the 1948 Winter Olympics
Medalists at the 1948 Winter Olympics
Olympic gold medalists for Canada
Olympic ice hockey players of Canada
Olympic medalists in ice hockey